This is a list of results for the Legislative Council at the 1981 New South Wales state election.

Results

Continuing members 

The following MLCs were not up for re-election this year.

 While Derek Freeman was not elected at the election, he was appointed as a casual vacancy following the death of Fergus Darling, whose term would have continued until 1984.

See also 
 Results of the 1981 New South Wales state election (Legislative Assembly)
 Candidates of the 1981 New South Wales state election
 Members of the New South Wales Legislative Council, 1981–1984

References 

1981 Legislative Council
New South Wales Legislative Council